Absonemobius is a genus of South American crickets in the subfamily Nemobiinae.

Taxonomy
The Orthoptera Species File database lists the following species:
Absonemobius alatus Otte, 2006
Absonemobius guyanensis Desutter-Grandcolas, 1993
Absonemobius minor Desutter-Grandcolas, 1993
Absonemobius nauta Desutter-Grandcolas, 1993
Absonemobius niger Desutter-Grandcolas, 1993
Absonemobius tessellatus Desutter-Grandcolas, 1993 - type species

References

Trigonidiidae
Orthoptera genera